List of rivers in Rondônia (Brazilian State).

The list is arranged by drainage basin, with respective tributaries indented under each larger stream's name and ordered from downstream to upstream. Rondônia is located entirely within the Amazon Basin.

By Drainage Basin 

 Amazon River (Pará, Amazonas)
 Tapajós River (Amazonas)
 Juruena River (Mato Grosso)
 Iquê River
 Madeira River
 Aripuanã River (Amazonas)
 Roosevelt River
 Capitão Cardoso River
 Tenente Marques River
 Da Dúvida River
 Ji-Paraná River (Machado River)
 Preto River
 Miriti River
 Jacundá River
 Juruazinho River
 Juruá River
 Machadinho River
 Belém River
 São João River
 Anari River
 Jaru River
 Urupá River
 Muqui River
 Palha River
 Lacerda de Almeida River
 Acangapiranga River
 Rolim de Moura River
 Barão de Melgaço River
 Comemoração River
 Pimenta Bueno River
 Uimeerê River
 São Pedro River
 Do Ouro River
 Tanaru River
 Jamari River
 Verde River
 Candeias River
 Preto de Candeias River
 Das Garças River
 Preto do Crespo River
 Branco River
 Guaiamã River
 Quatro Cachoeiras River
 Pardo River
 Alto Jamari River
 Caracol River
 Jaciparaná River
 São Francisco River
 Branco River
 Formoso River
 Caripunás River
 Lourenço River
 Cutia River
 Mutumparaná River
 Abunã River
 Vermelho River
 Mamoré River
 Pacaás Novos River
 Ouro Preto River
 Novo River
 Negro River
 Sotério River
 Guaporé River
 Cautário River
 São Domingos River
 Cantarinho River
 São Miguel River
 São Francisco River
 Cabixi River
 Branco River
 São Simão River
 Colorado River
 Mequéns River
 Verde River
 São João River
 Mequéns River
 Corumbiara River
 Escondido River
 Branco River (Cabixi River)
 Purus River (Amazonas)
 Ipixuna River

Alphabetically 

 Abunã River
 Acangapiranga River
 Alto Jamari River
 Anari River
 Barão de Melgaço River
 Belém River
 Branco River (Cabixi River)
 Branco River
 Branco River
 Branco River
 Cabixi River
 Candeias River
 Cantarinho River
 Capitão Cardoso River
 Caracol River
 Caripunás River
 Cautário River
 Colorado River
 Comemoração River
 Corumbiara River
 Cutia River
 Da Dúvida River
 Escondido River
 Formoso River
 Das Garças River
 Guaiamã River
 Guaporé River
 Iquê River
 Ipixuna River
 Jaciparaná River
 Jacundá River
 Jamari River
 Jaru River
 Ji-Paraná River (Machado River)
 Juruá River
 Juruazinho River
 Lacerda de Almeida River
 Lourenço River
 Machadinho River
 Madeira River
 Mamoré River
 Mequéns River
 Mequéns River
 Miriti River
 Muqui River
 Mutumparaná River
 Negro River
 Novo River
 Do Ouro River
 Ouro Preto River
 Pacaás Novos River
 Palha River
 Pardo River
 Pimenta Bueno River
 Preto de Candeias River
 Preto do Crespo River
 Preto River
 Quatro Cachoeiras River
 Rolim de Moura River
 Roosevelt River
 São Domingos River
 São Francisco River
 São Francisco River
 São João River
 São João River
 São Miguel River
 São Pedro River
 São Simão River
 Sotério River
 Tanaru River
 Tenente Marques River
 Uimeerê River
 Urupá River
 Verde River
 Verde River
 Vermelho River

References
 Map from Ministry of Transport

 
Rondonia
Environment of Rondônia